Ferryden Park Football Club was an Australian rules football club based in Ferryden Park, South Australia that folded following the 1995 South Australian Amateur Football League (SAAFL) season due to financial problems and a lack of players.

History 
The club was formed initially as a junior club in March 1964 playing in the West Torrens-Woodville Junior Association.  The following season, senior teams were formed and the club joined the North Adelaide District Football Association.  After a short stay in the North Adelaide Association, the club shifted to the South Australian Amateur Football League in 1968 and in 1978 became a founding member of the South Australian Football Association.  In 1985, the club returned to the South Australian Amateur Football League where it competed until its demise at the end of 1995.

A-Grade Premierships 
 North Adelaide District Football Association A2 (1)
 1965
 South Australian Amateur Football League A2 (1)
 1976 
 South Australian Amateur Football League A3 (1)
 1970 
 South Australian Amateur Football League A4 (1)
 1969

References 

Australian rules football clubs in South Australia
1964 establishments in Australia
1995 disestablishments in Australia
Australian rules football clubs established in 1964
Australian rules football clubs disestablished in 1995